Sesostri re di Egitto (IAB 13) (Sesostris, King of Egypt) is a three-act melodramma/opera composed by Italian composer Antonio Maria Bononcini in 1716, composed for seven voices and a seven-instrument orchestra. The Italian language libretto, written by Apostolo Zeno and Pietro Pariati, was published the same year in Milan by publisher Marc'Antonio Pandolfo Malatesta. The work premiered at the Teatro Regio Ducale on February 2, 1716. The opera is dedicated to Prince Eugene of Savoy and Piedmont, and tells the story about the mythical king Sesostris of Egypt.

The original manuscript is currently being held at the Saxon State Library in Dresden, Germany. There is currently no contemporary recording or performance of the work.

Roles 
There are seven characters in the work.

Instrumentation 
The opera's orchestra consists of seven instruments:

 Violins
 Viola
 Hautbois (Baroque ancestor to the modern-day oboe)
 Cellos (violoncello)
 Bassoons (fagotto)
 Contrabassoon (in the score it simply reads contrabasso)
 Harpsichord (cembalo)

References

External links
 

1716 operas
Operas by Antonio Maria Bononcini
Italian-language operas
Operas set in ancient Egypt
Music dedicated to nobility or royalty
Operas